The 2019 Dublin Senior Football Championship was the 133rd edition of Dublin GAA's premier gaelic football tournament for senior clubs in County Dublin, Ireland. 32 teams participate (16 in Senior 1 and 16 in Senior 2), with the winner of Senior 1 representing Dublin in the Leinster Senior Club Football Championship.

Round Towers, Lusk won the 2018 I.F.C. and were promoted to Senior 2. Thomas Davis won the Senior 2 Championship and were promoted to Senior 1.

Senior 1

Teams

Group 1

Round 1

Round 2

Round 3

Group 2

Round 1

Round 2

Round 3

Group 3

Round 1

Round 2

Round 3

Group 4

Round 1

Round 2

Round 3

Quarter-finals

Semi-finals

Final

Relegation play-offs
 Skerries Harps 1-20, 1-14 St. Brigid's, St. Margaret's, 13/10/2019,
 St. Oliver Plunkett's 1-13, 2-8 St. Sylvester's, Drumnigh, 26/10/2019,

Senior 2

Teams

Group 1

Round 1

Round 2

Round 3

Group 2

Round 1

Round 2

Round 3

Group 3

Round 1

Round 2

Round 3

Group 4

Round 1

Round 2

Round 3

Senior 2 Football Championship Knock-Out Stage

Last Eight

Quarter-finals

Semifinals

Final

Relegation play-offs
 Parnells 0-13, 1-8 St. Patrick's Palmerstown, Garristown, 13/10/2019, (AET)
 Erin's Isle 2-11, 0-14 Round Towers Clondalkin, Bohernabreena, 13/10/2019,

References

External links
Dublin GAA Fixtures & Results

Dublin Senior Football Championship
Dublin Senior Football Championship
Dublin SFC